Aaron Ayre (born 6 August 1992) is an Australian cricketer who plays as a wicket-keeper. He made his first-class debut for Victoria on 14 November 2015 in the 2015–16 Sheffield Shield. On 9 January 2016 he made his Twenty20 debut for the Melbourne Renegades in the 2015–16 Big Bash League.

References

External links
 

1992 births
Living people
Australian cricketers
Victoria cricketers
Melbourne Renegades cricketers
Sportspeople from Canberra